Campocasso, real name Auguste Deloche, (30 September 1833 – August 1908) was a 19th-century French theatre director.

After he had managed the Theatre of Lille, and then the one in Algiers in 1865, this deft impresario was  appointed director of the Théâtre royal de la Monnaie in Brussels in 1873. After two seasons, he left the city to become director of the Théâtre Lyrique in Paris.

He was named director of the Grand Théâtre de Marseille in 1876, a position he kept until 1881, then was several times director of the Théâtre de Lyon.

Career 
 1863-1865: Lille
 1865-1867: Alger
 1867-1868: Anvers
 1869-1870: Toulouse
 1870-1873: Paris
 1873-1875: Brussels
 1875-1876: Paris
 1876-1881: Marseille
 1881-1882: Lyon
 1883-1884: Rouen
 1885-1886: Marseille
 1886-1887: Lyon
 1888-1889: Lyon
 1892-1893: Paris
 1894-1895: Lyon

French theatre directors
Opera managers
People from Albert, Somme
1833 births
1908 deaths